Guy Speranza (March 12, 1956 – November 8, 2003) was an American singer best known as New York City-based metal band Riot's original frontman from 1975 to 1981.

He played at the first Monsters of Rock festival in 1980 and sang on their first three albums, 1977's Rock City, 1979's Narita and 1981's Fire Down Under, before leaving the band in 1981.

In 1982, Scott Ian called Speranza to offer him the position as the lead singer for Anthrax. Speranza declined the offer, saying he was done with the music business.

After retiring from music, Speranza worked as an exterminator in Florida until being diagnosed with pancreatic cancer, from which he died on November 8, 2003.

References

External links
 
Riot – Official Website

1956 births
2003 deaths
20th-century American singers
American heavy metal singers
American people of Italian descent
Deaths from cancer in Florida
Deaths from pancreatic cancer
Riot (band) members